"Planet of Sound" is a song by the American alternative rock band Pixies, from their 1991 album Trompe le Monde. It was written and sung by frontman Black Francis and produced by Gil Norton during the album's recording sessions. "Planet of Sound" was released as the first single from Trompe le Monde in the US and UK. The single version is a different mix from the one included on the album. The lyrics reference the instrumental song "Classical Gas" by Mason Williams.

Pixies singer Black Francis later re-recorded the song for his 2004 solo album Frank Black Francis.

Track listing

1991 singles
Pixies (band) songs
Songs written by Black Francis
Elektra Records singles
1991 songs
Song recordings produced by Gil Norton